The 2001 Immanuel bus attack was an ambush attack by Palestinian militants targeting Israeli civilians on the West Bank on 12 December 2001. Eleven passengers were killed in the attack and 30 were injured.

The Palestinian Islamist militant organization al-Qassam Brigades claimed responsibility for the attack.

The attack
On 12 December 2001, three armed Palestinians militants planted a roadside bomb beside the road leading to the Jewish settlement of Immanuel. After placing two roadside bombs, the assailants ambushed a bus on its way from Bnei Brak.

Soon after, a non-armoured Dan bus line 189, en route to Immanuel from Bnei Brak, approached the site as two roadside bombs exploded. The bus, which was greatly damaged in the explosions, continued to drive several hundred meters until it was immobilized. Immediately after the bus was immobilized, one of the militants approached the bus, threw hand grenades into the bus, and fired small arms on the passengers of the bus and at the vehicles arriving at the site, while the passengers attempted to flee the bus. The passengers of three other vehicles traveling on this road at that time were also affected.

Shortly after, the three attackers fired on cars near the settlement and rescue workers trying to help the victims. One gunman was run over by an army jeep and then shot dead, but the others escaped. Palestinian officials identified the dead man as 21-year-old Asem Rihan, a Hamas member and student at Al Najah University in Nablus.

11 people were killed in the attack and about 30 were injured.

Official reactions
Involved parties
:
 Israeli government spokesman Avi Pazner said, "We hold the Palestinian authorities responsible for the activities of these terrorist group who operate in full daylight and in the full knowledge of the Palestinian Authority and continue their deadly attacks against civilian men, women and children".

:
 The Palestinian Authority condemned the attack.

See also
 Israeli casualties of war

External links 
 Bus ambush brings carnage back to Israel - published on Independent Online on 12 December 2001
 Terrorist attack on bus at Emmanuel - 12 December 2001 - published on the Israeli Foreign Ministry website
 Several Dead In Shooting On Israeli Bus - published on the New Straits Times on 13 December 2001
 Israel Retaliates After Hamas Attacks Bus - published on the Bangor Daily News on 13 December 2001
 Eight killed in Palestinian attack on Israeli bus - published on the Bangor Daily News on 13 December 2001

References

Explosions in 2001
Mass murder in 2001
Palestinian suicide bomber attacks against buses
Attacks on buses by Palestinian militant groups
2001 mass shootings in Asia
Murdered Israeli children
Al-Qassam Brigades Operations
December 2001 events in Asia
2001 in the Palestinian territories
Terrorist incidents in the West Bank in 2001